Kentucky Route 377 (KY 377) is a  state highway in the U.S. state of Kentucky. The highway connects mostly rural areas of Rowan and Lewis counties with the Morehead area.

Route description

Rowan County
KY 377 begins at an intersection with KY 32 (Flemingsburg Road) northwest of Morehead, within Rowan County, where the roadway continues as Stonehedge Drive. This intersection is just east of the Rowan County Senior High School. It travels to the east-northeast and curves to the north-northwest. It crosses over Big Brushy Creek and curves to the north-northeast. It begins traveling along the edge of Daniel Boone National Forest and temporarily enters the forest proper. It crosses over Grassy Lick, Pond Lick, and Weaver branches. The highway curves to a nearly due north direction and re-enters the forest. It crosses over DeBord and Emory branches and curves to the northeast. It travels through Cranston and crosses over Clear Fork. It crosses over Hogge Branch, passes Tildon–Hogge Elementary School, and crosses over Fisher Branch. It travels to the northeast and crosses over Rock Fork. It begins a concurrency with KY 799 (Rockfork Road). The two highways cross over Estep, Schoolhouse, and Shop branches before entering Triplett, where they split. KY 377 heads to a nearly due north direction. It crosses over Evans Branch and passes Evans Cemetery. It crosses over McClurg and Browning branches and passes Clark Cemetery before curving to the north-northwest. It begins paralleling the North Fork Triplett Creek. Later, the highway crosses over North Fork Triplett Creek and Adams Branch before passing Adams Cemetery. It crosses over Barn and Mock branches before leaving North Fork Triplett Creek. Right after this, it crosses over Bill Brown Hollow and begins paralleling it. The highway curves to the west-northwest, leaving the hollow. It then leaves the forest and enters Lewis County.

Lewis County
KY 377 curves to the north-northwest. It crosses over Duff and Mc Cless hollows before curving to the north-northeast. It crosses over Hardy Fork and begins paralleling Indian Creek. It crosses over Stamm Fork and curves to the northeast. It crosses over Kincaid, Little, Thomas, and Cloddy Field branches. It then crosses over Silver Lick Hollow and then Big, Mill, House, and Pea Vine branches. It finally crosses over Kinniconick Creek before it meets its northern terminus, an intersection with KY 344.

Major intersections

See also

References

0377
Transportation in Rowan County, Kentucky
Transportation in Lewis County, Kentucky